Rearmament may refer to:
German re-armament (Aufrüstung), the growth of the German military in contravention of the Versailles treaty (1930s)
British re-armament, the modernisation of the British military in response to German re-armament (1930s)
Salonika Agreement (31 July 1938), a treaty permitting Bulgaria to re-arm contrary to the Treaty of Neuilly
Bled agreement (1938), a treaty permitting Hungary to re-arm contrary to the Treaty of Trianon
West German rearmament, the American plan to help re-build the military in West Germany after World War II in response to the Cold War
Moral Re-Armament (MRA), an international religious movement that arose in 1938
Rearmament (album), by American singer/songwriter Happy Rhodes